Route Irish is a 2010 drama-thriller film directed by Ken Loach and written by Paul Laverty. It is set in Liverpool and focuses on the consequences suffered by private security contractors after fighting in the Iraq War. The title comes from the Baghdad Airport Road, known as "Route Irish". The film was a British-French co-production. It was selected for the main competition at the 2010 Cannes Film Festival.

Philip French, in The Observer, wrote that the film reprises several themes in Loach's films, such as state-sanctioned crime, the brutality of war, the exploitation of the underclass and harsh treatment of native populations.

Plot
The film opens on a ferry in Liverpool, as Fergus Molloy (Mark Womack) remembers the final messages sent to him by his lifelong friend Frankie (John Bishop), whose funeral he is to attend. The night before, Fergus unseals his friend's coffin to see his friend's badly injured corpse. At the funeral, Haynes (Jack Fortune) a director of the private military company that Fergus and Frankie worked for, gives a eulogy praising Frankie and describing military contractors as the "unsung heroes of our time". Afterwards, Haynes and Walker (Geoff Bell) explain to Frankie's family the circumstances of his death, though Fergus remains embittered and closely questions the two men. Later at the wake, Fergus attacks Haynes when he sees him distributing his business card to enlisted soldiers there.

Marisol (Najwa Nimri) bequeaths a package to Fergus, which Frankie had entrusted to a mutual friend with a note asking it be given to Fergus. With the help of Harim (Talib Rasool), an Iraqi musician, Fergus discovers a video on the phone which shows a member of Frankie's team killing an innocent Iraqi family a few weeks before his death. Fergus becomes suspicious, and has friends still working for the firm in Iraq investigate the incident, but it has not been recorded.

Cast
 Mark Womack as Fergus Molloy
 Andrea Lowe as Rachel
 John Bishop as Frankie
 Geoff Bell as Alex Walker
 Jack Fortune as Andrew Haynes
 Talib Rasool as Harim
 Craig Lundberg as Craig
 Trevor Williams as Nelson
 Russel Anderson as Tommy
 Jamie Michie as Jamie
 Stephen Lord as Steve
 Najwa Nimri as Marisol
 Anthony Schumacher as Andy
Tess as Tess the three legged dog

Production
Ken Loach's company Sixteen Films co-produced the film with France's Why Not Productions and Wild Bunch. It received funding from France 2 and North West Vision Media. Principal shooting took place on location in Liverpool with one week of shooting in Jordan, standing in for Iraq. The film reunited Loach with cinematographer Chris Menges who had worked on several of the director's films in the past, including Kes. The character Craig was played by actual Iraq war veteran Craig Lundberg, whom the writer had encountered while doing research. The waterboarding scene was performed for real on actor Trevor Williams, after the results had not been satisfactory during earlier attempts at merely staging the act. Despite the knowledge that he was safe, the filming left the actor deeply disturbed and caused "weeks of panic attacks". For a Ken Loach film, Route Irish uses an unusually high amount of stunt scenes and pyrotechnics.

Release
Route Irish was first shown on 20 May at the 2010 Cannes Film Festival, in competition as part of the official selection. According to festival general Thierry Fremaux, the film was not finished in time for the ordinary cut-off date. However, producer Rebecca O'Brien submitted it anyway as soon as it was ready, and it was accepted as a late addition only two days before the festival started. Ken Loach said in an interview that the team never considered having it ready for Cannes, but when it turned out that they were ahead of the schedule the French co-producers pushed for a submission. The film was released generally in France on 16 March 2011, and on the 18th in the United Kingdom. It was nominated for a Magritte Award in the category of Best Foreign Film in Coproduction in 2012, but lost to Romantics Anonymous.

References

External links 
 Official page on Sixteen Films, Loach's production company
 Film page on daphana.fr 
 
 Video interview with Loach from the University of Warwick
 Interview with Ken Loach, interview about Route Irish in the Oxonian Review

2010 films
Belgian thriller drama films
2010 thriller drama films
British thriller drama films
English-language Belgian films
English-language French films
English-language Spanish films
English-language Italian films
Films directed by Ken Loach
Films scored by George Fenton
Films set in Liverpool
Films set in Iraq
French thriller drama films
Iraq War films
Films shot in Jordan
Films shot in Wales
2010 drama films
2010s English-language films
2010s British films
2010s French films